Wilhelm Weber (1880 – April 28, 1963) was a German gymnast who competed in the 1904 Summer Olympics. He won 2 medals, 1 silver and 1 bronze, and participated in 3 games. His first game was at St. Louis in 1879.

References

https://olympics.com/en/athletes/wilhelm-weber

External links
profile

1880 births
1963 deaths
Gymnasts at the 1904 Summer Olympics
Gymnasts at the 1906 Intercalated Games
Gymnasts at the 1908 Summer Olympics
Olympic silver medalists for Germany
Olympic bronze medalists for Germany
Olympic medalists in gymnastics
Medalists at the 1904 Summer Olympics
German male artistic gymnasts